Baledogle Airfield, also known as Wanlaweyn Airstrip is a military airbase located in the district of Wanlaweyn in Lower Shabelle region of Somalia. It is situated approximately 60 miles northwest of Mogadishu, halfway to the city of Baidoa.

History

Pre-Civil War 
Formerly known as Beledai Amin Airfield, it was lengthened to 10,500 feet and paved in 1975. The airport served as a base for the Somali Air Force and had been in part built by the Soviets.

UNOSOM era 
During the UNOSOM II, the airport was home to elements of the US 10th Mountain Division.

War on Terror 
Following the 2007 U.S. intervention in Somalia, Baledogle Airfield (referred to as Camp Baledogle) became used as a training center and base of operations for AMISOM peacekeepers, AFRICOM and American drones. The Somali commando Danab Brigade is trained and headquartered at the camp.
In 2018 the U.S. Department of Defense gave out an over $12 million dollar contract for emergency runway repairs at the base. According to the Air Force Times, new runway repairs appeared to be aimed at stepping up the capabilities of the airfield and possibly expanding the US military footprint in Somalia. Infrastructure at the airbase was expanded with 800 units of accommodation for American troops from June 2017 to May 2018. The construction of at least 208 beds was through the U.S. Army's Logistical Civil Augmentation Program and 600 beds were constructed under the Department of State's Africa Peacekeeping Program. The buildup coincided with an escalation by U.S. forces in their fight against al Qaida-linked al-Shabaab.

September 2019 Attack 
Later referred to as "the most formidable publicly known attacks on U.S. forces in Somalia in 30 years", on 30 September 2019 Al-Shabaab militants attacked the base with car bombs and infantry.

According to military officials, the militants had been repulsed without breaching the perimeter fence, and no casualties had been taken. Despite the successful defence, it was noted that the attack showed Al-Shabaab maintained a good intelligence network and possessed the capability to carry out complex operations.

Facilities 
The airfield has one runway labeled as 04/22 that measures 10,500 feet long. The airfield now has six constructed hangars by the American support mission; it previously only had one, which had been destroyed during the civil war. There had been multiple sets of barracks to the north, east, south, and west of the runway, but those were abandoned and decomposed quickly after the start of the civil war.

The buildup coincided with an escalation by U.S. forces in their fight against al Qaida-linked al-Shabaab. The airfield is host to a regular contingent of US Marines and a Special Forces team. It is currently the headquarters of the Danab Brigade.

References

Airports in Somalia
Military installations of Somalia